Expert Review of Clinical Immunology is a monthly peer-reviewed medical journal covering all aspects of clinical immunology. It is part of the Expert Review series, published by Informa. The editors-in-chief are Thomas Forsthuber (University of Texas at San Antonio) and Timothy Radstake (University Medical Center Utrecht). The journal was established in 2005. According to the Journal Citation Reports, the journal has a 2013 impact factor of 3.342.

References

External links 
 

Immunology journals
English-language journals
Expert Review journals
Monthly journals
Publications established in 2005